Natalia Sergeyevna Romaniuta (born 26 May 1982) is a Russian ice dancer. She is a two-time (2000, 2001) World Junior champion with Daniil Barantsev.

Career 
Early in her career, Romaniuta competed with Evgeni Zagovalko.

Romaniuta teamed up with Daniil Barantsev in 1996. They began competing on the ISU Junior Series in 1997, winning a silver medal and placing 4th at their two events. They qualified for their first ISU Junior Grand Prix Final, where they finished 5th. They placed 7th in their first appearance at the World Junior Championships.

The following season, Romaniuta / Barantsev won gold and silver on JGP series and qualified for their second Final, where they took the bronze medal. They finished their season with bronze at the 1999 World Junior Championships.

In 1999–2000, Romaniuta / Barantsev won gold in every junior-level they entered, including the JGP Final and the 2000 World Junior Championships. They also made their senior international debut at the 2000 World Championships in Nice, France, finishing 16th.

In 2000–2001, they competed on the senior Grand Prix series, finishing 6th and 9th at their two events. They were sent again to Junior Worlds and took their second gold medal at the event.

In the 2001–2002 season, Romaniuta / Barantsev competed a second season on the Grand Prix series, winning bronze at the 2001 Sparkassen Cup and placing 5th at 2001 Cup of Russia. They were assigned to the 2002 European Championships but withdrew from the event.

Barantsev left the partnership in 2002. Romaniuta briefly teamed up with Arseni Markov but the partnership did not last.

Personal life 
Romaniuta was born in Hungary because her father was serving there in the Soviet army, but was raised in Yekaterinburg. Romaniuta is married and gave birth to a son, Egor, in 2004.

Programs 
(with Barantsev)

Competitive highlights 
(with Barantsev)

References

External links
 
 Romaniuta & Barantsev official site

Navigation

Russian female ice dancers
Living people
1982 births
World Junior Figure Skating Championships medalists
Sportspeople from Yekaterinburg